Simon Razgor (born 18 September 1985) is a Slovenian handball player who plays for RK Maribor Branik.

With Slovenia, he participated at the 2016 Summer Olympics in Rio de Janeiro.

References

External links

1985 births
Living people
Sportspeople from Celje
Slovenian male handball players
Olympic handball players of Slovenia
Handball players at the 2016 Summer Olympics
Expatriate handball players
Slovenian expatriate sportspeople in Belarus
21st-century Slovenian people